André A. Faust (born October 7, 1969) is a Canadian former professional ice hockey left winger. He was drafted by New Jersey Devils in the 1989 NHL Entry Draft in 9th round as the 173rd pick overall. Faust is the first Princeton University alumnus to score a goal in the NHL.

Playing career
During his career Faust played in NCAA, NHL, AHL, DEL, Swedish Elitserien and Danish Superisligaen. In the NHL he played 47 games for the Philadelphia Flyers during the 1992/93 and 1993/94 season. In the 1995/96 season, he played for the AHL club Springfield Falcons after he was traded to the Winnipeg Jets for a 7th round pick in the 1997 NHL Entry Draft, he never played for Winnipeg. In 1996, Faust moved to Germany and played for Augsburger Panther (1996–2000) and Kölner Haie (2000–02). In 2002, he signed with Swedish club Färjestads BK. After that season Faust moved to a new club, Odense, and a new country, Denmark. Faust played there for one season and then he retired from ice hockey.

Career statistics

Awards and honors

References

External links
 

1969 births
Augsburger Panther players
Canadian ice hockey left wingers
Färjestad BK players
Hershey Bears players
Ice hockey people from Quebec
Kölner Haie players
Living people
New Jersey Devils draft picks
People from Joliette
Philadelphia Flyers players
Princeton Tigers men's ice hockey players
Springfield Falcons players
Upper Canada College alumni
Canadian expatriate ice hockey players in Germany
Canadian expatriate ice hockey players in Sweden